This is a list of Walter Lantz "Cartunes" featuring Wally Walrus.  Most are entries in Lantz's Woody Woodpecker, but Wally has also appeared in The Overture to William Tell, Dog Tax Dodgers, Kiddie Koncert, Clash and Carry, and Tricky Trout, which are Musical Miniatures, Andy Panda and Chilly Willy cartunes.

Directors for each short are noted. Several Woody Woodpecker cartoons produced in 1951 and 1952 carry no director credit; Walter Lantz claims to have directed these shorts himself. The fifteen cartoons were released in The Woody Woodpecker and Friends Classic Cartoon Collection.

Released by Universal Pictures

1944
(All cartoons directed by James Culhane.)
 The Beach Nut
 Ski for Two

1945
(All cartoons directed by James Culhane.)
 Chew-Chew Baby
 The Dippy Diplomat

1946
 Bathing Buddies (Dick Lundy)
 The Reckless Driver (Culhane)

1947
(All cartoons directed by Dick Lundy.)
Smoked Hams
The Overture to William Tell
Well Oiled

Released by United Artists

1948
(All cartoons directed by Dick Lundy.)
The Mad Hatter
Banquet Busters
Kiddie Koncert
Wacky-Bye Baby
Dog Tax Dodgers

Released by Universal International

1951
(All cartoons directed by Walter Lantz - no onscreen credit)
Sleep Happy
Slingshot 6 7/8
The Woody Woodpecker Polka

1952
Stage Hoax (Lantz - no onscreen credit)

1953
(All cartoons directed by Don Patterson)
What's Sweepin
Buccaneer Woodpecker
Operation Sawdust

1961
(All cartoons directed by Jack Hannah)
 Clash and Carry
 Tricky Trout

References
 Tatay, Jack, Komorowski, Thad, Shakarian, Pietro, and Cooke, Jon. The Walter Lantz Cartune Encyclopedia. Retrieved February 29, 2008.

Wally Walrus
pt:Anexo:Lista de episódios do Pica-Pau